Ousman Miangoto (born October 15, 1954) is a middle distance athlete who competed internationally for Chad

Miangoto represented Chad at the 1984 Summer Olympics in Los Angeles. He competed in the 800 metres where he finished eighth in his heat so didn't qualify for the next round.

References

1954 births
Living people
Olympic athletes of Chad
Athletes (track and field) at the 1984 Summer Olympics
Chadian male middle-distance runners